John Joseph Glennon (June 14, 1862 – March 9, 1946) was a prelate of the Roman Catholic Church, serving as Archbishop of St. Louis from 1903 until his death in 1946. He was elevated to the cardinalate in 1946.

Early life and ministry
John Glennon was born in Kinnegad, County Westmeath, Ireland, to Matthew and Catherine (née Rafferty) Glennon. After graduating from St. Finian's College, he entered All Hallows College near Dublin in 1878. He accepted an invitation from Bishop John Joseph Hogan in 1882 to join the newly erected Diocese of Kansas City in the United States. Glennon, after arriving in Missouri in 1883, was ordained to the priesthood by Bishop Hogan on December 20, 1884.

He was then assigned to St. Patrick's Church in Kansas City and, briefly returning to Europe, furthered his studies at the University of Bonn in Germany. Upon his return to Kansas City, Glennon became rector of the Cathedral of the Immaculate Conception. He was later made vicar general (1892) and apostolic administrator (1894) for the diocese.

Episcopal career
On March 14, 1896, Glennon was appointed Coadjutor Bishop of Kansas City and Titular Bishop of Pinara by Pope Leo XIII. He received his episcopal consecration on the following June 29 from Archbishop John Joseph Kain, with Bishops Maurice Francis Burke and John Joseph Hennessy serving as co-consecrators. At age 34, he became one of the youngest bishops in the world.

Archbishop of St. Louis
Glennon was later named Coadjutor Archbishop of St. Louis on April 27, 1903. He succeeded Archbishop Kain as the third Archbishop of St. Louis upon the latter's death on October 13 of that year. Realizing the Cathedral of St. Louis could no longer accommodate its growing congregation, Glennon quickly began raising funds for a new cathedral, the cornerstone of which was later laid on October 18, 1908.

He opened the new Kenrick Seminary in 1915, followed by the minor seminary in Shrewsbury. He delivered the eulogy at the funeral of Cardinal James Gibbons, and was appointed an Assistant at the Pontifical Throne on June 28, 1921.

Politics and war
On July 7, 1904, he offered the invocation at the second session of the 1904 Democratic National Convention.  He opposed British rule in Ireland, and supported the leaders of the Easter Rebellion.  Following the bombing of Pearl Harbor in 1941, Glennon declared, "We are not a military nation, but we are at war.... Churches have a duty in time of war not to promote hatred, racial or otherwise. Churches should give their moral aid and their physical support to the nation."

Social issues
He was an outspoken opponent of divorce, saying, "The modern attitude makes a joke of the sacrament of matrimony." The Archbishop once lamented the fact that women were competing with men in the workforce, saying, "Some of the women go downtown in the race and race beside the men...It is regrettable that men have to let them, are compelled to let them."  He also condemned gambling games as "unworthy of our Catholic people...causing much scandal," and prohibited dancing and drinking at church-sponsored events. The Archbishop sometimes threw the opening ball for the St. Louis Cardinals, but did not play any sports himself, once saying, "I once tried golf, but I so disfigured the scenery that I never played again, in fear of public indignation and reprisal."

Segregation
Despite a rather popular tenure, as Archbishop of St. Louis he opposed racial integration in the city's Catholic schools, colleges, and universities. During the early 1940s, many local priests, especially Jesuits, challenged the segregationist policies at the city's Catholic schools. The St. Louis chapter of the Midwest Clergy Conference on Negro Welfare, formed locally in 1938, pushed the all-female Webster College to integrate first. However, in 1943, Glennon blocked the enrollment of a young black woman at the college by speaking privately with the Kentucky-based superior of the Sisters of Loretto, which staffed the college. When approached directly by pro-integration priests, Glennon called the integration plan a "Jesuit ploy," and quickly transferred one of the complaining priests away from his mission at an African-American parish. The Pittsburgh Courier, an African-American newspaper with national circulation, discovered Glennon's intervention and ran a front-page feature on the Webster incident. In response, Father Claude Heithaus, professor of Classical Archaeology at the Catholic Saint Louis University, delivered an angry sermon accusing his own institution of immoral behavior in its segregation policies. Saint Louis University began admitting African American students that summer when its president, Father Patrick Holloran, managed to secure approval from the reluctant Archbishop Glennon. Nevertheless, St. Louis maintained one of the largest numbers of African-American parishes and schools in the country.

Cardinal and death

On Christmas Eve 1945, it was announced that the 83-year-old Glennon would be elevated to the College of Cardinals. He originally thought himself too old to make the journey to Rome, but eventually joined fellow Cardinals-elect Francis Spellman and Thomas Tien Ken-sin on their flight, during which time Glennon contracted a cold from which he did not recover. Pope Pius XII created him Cardinal Priest of S. Clemente in the consistory of February 18, 1946.

During the return trip to the United States, Glennon stopped in his native Ireland, where he was received by President Seán T. O'Kelly and Taoiseach Éamon de Valera. While in Dublin, he was diagnosed with uremic poisoning and later died, ending a 42-year tenure as Archbishop. The Cardinal's body was returned to St. Louis and then buried at the Cathedral.

Glennon is the namesake of the community of Glennonville, Missouri. The only diocesan hospital for children, Cardinal Glennon Children's Hospital, affiliated with St. Louis University Medical Center, was created in his name.

Notes

References
Christensen, Lawrence O., et al. Dictionary of Missouri Biography.  Columbia, MO:University of Missouri Press, 1997.  

1862 births
1946 deaths
19th-century Irish people
People from County Meath
Roman Catholic bishops of Kansas City
19th-century Roman Catholic bishops in the United States
20th-century American cardinals
American Roman Catholic clergy of Irish descent
Roman Catholic archbishops of St. Louis
Cardinals created by Pope Pius XII
People educated at St Finian's College
Alumni of All Hallows College, Dublin
Irish emigrants to the United States (before 1923)
People from Kansas City, Missouri
Clergy from St. Louis
University of Bonn alumni
Burials at the Cathedral Basilica of Saint Louis (St. Louis)
Catholics from Missouri